Historic Artists' Homes and Studios program is a network of about 30 artists' homes and studios in the United States. The network of house museums is a program of the National Trust for Historic Preservation.

Buildings

101 Spring Street, New York City, home and studio of artist Donald Judd (1928–1994).
 Albin Polasek Museum and Sculpture Gardens, Winter Park, Florida, home and studio of sculptor Albin Polasek (1879–1965)
Alice Austen House, Staten Island, New York, home of Alice Austen (1866–1952)
Ann Norton Sculpture Gardens, West Palm Beach, Florida, home of sculptor Ann Weaver Norton (1905-1982)
Burchfield Homestead Museum, home of Charles Ephraim Burchfield 
Thomas Cole National Historic Site, Catskill, New York, home of Thomas Cole (1801–1848)
Demuth Museum, Lancaster, Pennsylvania, primary residence of the artist Charles Demuth (1883–1935)
Daniel Chester French studio, Chesterwood, in Stockbridge, Massachusetts
Eanger Irving Couse, Taos, New Mexico, historic home and studio of Eanger Irving Couse (1866–1936)
Edward Virginius Valentine, Richmond, Virginia, sculpture studio of Edward V. Valentine (1838–1930)
Elisabet Ney Museum, Austin, Texas studio of Elisabet Ney (1833–1907)
Florence Griswold Museum, Old Lyme, Connecticut, home of Florence Griswold and center of the Old Lyme Art Colony
Fonthill Museum, Doylestown, Pennsylvania, home of Henry Chapman Mercer (1856–1930), archaeologist, collector, and tile maker
Frelinghuysen Morris House and Studio, home of George L.K. Morris and Suzy Frelinghuysen in Lenox, Massachusetts
Gari Melchers Home and Studio, Falmouth, Virginia
Grace Hudson Museum and Sun House, Ukiah, California, home of Grace Carpenter Hudson (1865–1937)
Grant Wood studio, Cedar Rapids, Iowa
Kirkland Museum of Fine & Decorative Art, Denver, Colorado, original studio and art school building of Vance Kirkland
Manitoga, The Russel Wright Design Center of Russel Wright (1904–1976) and Mary Wright, Garrison, New York; includes the Russel and Mary Wright Design Gallery
Melrose Plantation Natchitoches Parish, Louisiana home of Clementine Hunter (1887–1988)
N. C. Wyeth House and Studio of artist N.C. Wyeth (1882-1945) at Brandywine River Museum of Art in Chadds Ford Township, Pennsylvania
Newsday Center for Dove/Torr Studies of Arthur Dove and Helen Torr
Olana State Historic Site, home of Frederic E. Church (1826–1900) near Hudson, New York
Pewabic Pottery pottery of Mary Chase Perry Stratton (1867–1961) in Detroit, Michigan
Pollock-Krasner House and Study Center of Jackson Pollock (1912–1956) and Lee Krasner (1908–1984) in East Hampton, New York
Renee and Chaim Gross Foundation of Chaim Gross
Roger Brown Study Collection of Roger Brown
Saint-Gaudens National Historic Site of Augustus Saint-Gaudens (1848–1907)
Sam Maloof Historic Residence and Woodworking Studio of Sam Maloof (born 1916) 
T. C. Steele State Historic Site of Theodore Clement Steele (1847–1926)
Thomas Hart Benton Home and Studio State Historic Site of Thomas Hart Benton (1889–1975)
Weir Farm National Historic Site of J. Alden Weir (1852–1919)
Wharton Esherick Museum of Wharton Esherick (1887–1970)
Beatrice Wood Center for the Arts of Beatrice Wood (1893–1998) in Ojai, California

References

External links
 

Houses in the United States
National Trust for Historic Preservation
Historic preservation organizations in the United States